Cheer the Brave is a 1951 British comedy film directed by Kenneth Hume and starring Elsie Randolph, Jack McNaughton and Geoffrey Keen. It was made at Southall Studios as a second feature.

A mild-mannered man gets married, but soon finds his new wife to be a domineering tyrant. After discovering her previous husband is not really dead, he manages to escape from her clutches.

Cast
 Elsie Randolph as Doris Wilson 
 Jack McNaughton as Bill Potter  
 Geoffrey Keen as Wilson  
 Marie Ault as Mother-in-Law  
 Vida Hope 
 Mavis Villiers 
 Eileen Way 
 Gordon Mulholland 
 Sam Kydd 
 Rose Howlett
 Helen Goss 
 Michael Ward 
 John Bull
 Elizabeth Saunders
 Jennifer Duncan
 Molly Weir

References

Bibliography
 Chibnall, Steve & McFarlane, Brian. The British 'B' Film. Palgrave MacMillan, 2009.

External links

1951 films
British comedy films
1951 comedy films
Films set in London
Films shot at Southall Studios
British black-and-white films
1950s English-language films
1950s British films